Zhangixalus hungfuensis is a species of frog in the family Rhacophoridae. It is found in southern China and northern Vietnam. Its natural habitats are subtropical or tropical moist lowland forests, subtropical or tropical moist montane forests, subtropical or tropical moist shrubland, rivers, and freshwater marshes.

References

hungfuensis
Amphibians of China
Amphibians of Vietnam
Taxonomy articles created by Polbot
Amphibians described in 1961